Château du Mirail  is a château in Gironde, Nouvelle-Aquitaine, France.

Châteaux in Gironde
Monuments historiques of Gironde